John Snyder (born April 13, 1987) is an American politician serving as a member of the Florida House of Representatives for the 82nd district. He assumed office on November 3, 2020.

Early life and education
Snyder was born in Hobe Sound, Florida. He had served in the United States Marines Corps from 2007 to 2012. Snyder earned a bachelor's degree from Indiana Wesleyan University.

His father William Snyder had also served in Florida House of Representatives from 2006 to 2012 and is a current sheriff for Martin County.

Election history

References

1987 births
Republican Party members of the Florida House of Representatives
Indiana Wesleyan University alumni
21st-century American politicians
United States Marine Corps personnel of the War in Afghanistan (2001–2021)
Living people